Susan M. Crown (born 	1960/1961) is an American businessperson. She is founder and chairman of the Susan Crown Exchange (SCE), and chairman and CEO of Owl Creek Partners.

Early life and education
Crown is the daughter of Renée (née Schine) and Lester Crown. She earned a bachelor's degree from Yale University in Connecticut and a master's degree from New York University. She also attended Kellogg Graduate School of Management at Northwestern University.

Career
She was the first woman board member of  Illinois Tool Works, and now chairs its executive committee. She is a board member of Northern Trust Corporation, and a former board member of Baxter International.

Crown is vice-chair of Rush University Medical Center.  She is a former fellow of Yale Corporation and co-chaired the Yale Tomorrow Campaign. She is a director of CARE USA and, in 2011, co-chaired its national conference on global poverty.

Susan Crown Exchange
SCE partners with organizations to create social change. SCE’s mission is to help people acquire skills needed to succeed and thrive in a rapidly changing, highly connected world. SCE is focused on two program areas: digital learning and social and emotional learning, building grit, empathy, and emotion management. The Exchange intends to add programs to cultivate other 21st century skills.

In digital learning, SCE partnered with Common Sense Media to develop a learning ratings system, and have rated more than 3,500 digital learning products.

Owl Creek Partners
Owl Creek Partners is a private equity company with focused investments in real estate, securities, and consumer products.

Personal life
In 1981, Crown married William Charles Kunkler III in an interfaith ceremony in Chicago. They live in Chicago. They have two children.

References

Living people
1958 births
American people of Lithuanian-Jewish descent
Jewish American philanthropists
New York University alumni
Yale University alumni
Kellogg School of Management alumni
Brookings Institution people
Crown Family